The list of Georgia hurricanes includes tropical or subtropical cyclones that have affected the U.S. state of Georgia. Fewer hurricanes have hit Georgia directly (due to its location and shorter coastline) than other states in the Southeast, with an estimated return period of 10–11 years. The last system to make landfall in the state at hurricane intensity was Hurricane David in 1979. Further, only four major hurricanes have struck Georgia, the most recent of which being Michael in 2018. However, numerous tropical cyclones have passed near or through the state.

List of storms

Most of the following are tropical cyclones that passed through the states after weakening from their peak.

Pre-1950
August 27, 1893 – Sea Islands Hurricane hit Sea Islands, causing major damage.
August 30-September 1, 1898 – second storm hit "near South Carolina border", putting it at mouth of Savannah River just downstream from Savannah.
October 2, 1898 – 1898 Georgia hurricane struck Cumberland Island as a category 4 hurricane with  winds, causing heavy damage amounting to around $1 million, and 179 casualties.

1950–1959
Hurricane Baker (1950)
Hurricane Easy (1950)
Hurricane King
Hurricane Able (1951)
Hurricane Able (1952)
Tropical Storm Alice (1953)
Hurricane Florence (1953)
Tropical Storm Hazel (1953)
Tropical Storm One (1956)
Hurricane Flossy (1956)
Unnamed Subtropical Cyclone 1956
Tropical Storm One (1957)
Hurricane Audrey
Tropical Storm Debbie (1957)
Tropical Storm Esther (1957)
Tropical Storm Arlene (1959)
1959 Escuminac disaster
Hurricane Cindy (1959)
Hurricane Gracie
Tropical Storm Irene (1959)

1960–1969

Tropical Storm Brenda (1960)
Hurricane Donna
Hurricane Ethel (1960)
Tropical Storm Florence (1960)
Hurricane Alma (1962)
September Gulf of Mexico tropical depression (1962)
Tropical Storm One (1964)
Hurricane Cleo
Hurricane Dora
Hurricane Hilda
September 30-October 1, 1965 – The remnants of Tropical Storm Debbie result in precipitation across much of Georgia, with up to  observed in Greenville. In the Brunswick area, heavy rains flooded airfields and canals.
High winds damaged a few houses and downed trees near Albany, Georgia. The winds overturned a bus at Fort Gordon, injuring 11 soldiers. The storm caused about $50,000 in damage in the state.
Sustained winds between  downed power lines. Overall, damage was minor, reaching less than $100,000.
October 19-20, 1968 – Hurricane Gladys dropped rain across roughly two-thirds of Georgia, with a peak amount of  near Jesup.
August 17-20, 1969 – The outer bands of Hurricane Camille drop light rainfall, particularly in the northern portions of the state, peaking at  near Elberton.
September 20-22, 1969 – Tropical Depression Twenty-Nine dropped torrential rainfall across southwestern Georgia, with up to  observed in Attapulgus. Severe local flooding ensued, particularly in Decatur County, causing damage to property and crops, mostly to peanuts that were not threshed.

1970–1979
Tropical Storm Becky (1970)
Tropical Depression Eight (1971)
Tropical Storm Doria (1971)
Tropical Depression Eleven (1971)
Hurricane Edith (1971)
Subtropical Storm Alpha (1972)
Hurricane Agnes
Hurricane Dawn (1972)
Tropical Depression Eleven (1973)
Tropical Depression Thirteen (1973)
1974 Florida subtropical storm
Hurricane Carmen
Tropical Storm Amy (1975)
Tropical Depression Nine (1975)
Hurricane Eloise
Tropical Depression Twenty-Two (1975)
Subtropical Storm One (1976)
Tropical Storm Dottie
Subtropical Storm Three (1976)
Hurricane Babe (1977)
Tropical Depression One (1979)
Hurricane David
Hurricane Frederic

1980–1989
Hurricane Dennis (1981)
1982 Florida subtropical storm
Tropical Storm Chris (1982)
Tropical Depression One (1984)
Tropical Storm Isidore (1984)
Tropical Depression (1984)
Hurricane Bob (1985)
Hurricane Danny (1985)
Hurricane Elena
Tropical Storm Isabel (1985)
Hurricane Juan (1985)
Hurricane Kate (1985)
Hurricane Bonnie (1986)
Hurricane Charley (1986)
1987 Gulf Coast tropical storm
Tropical Depression Nine (1987)
Tropical Depression Fourteen (1987)
Tropical Depression Four (1988)
Tropical Storm Chris (1988)
Tropical Depression Ten (1988)
Hurricane Florence (1988)
Tropical Storm Keith (1988)
Tropical Storm Allison (1989)
Hurricane Hugo

1990–1999

October 12–14, 1990 – The remnants of Tropical Storm Marco and moisture from the remains of Hurricane Klaus combine, producing heavy rainfall in Georgia, peaking at  near Louisville. Some roads in eastern Georgia were flooded up to 6 feet (1.8 m) deep. The flooding resulted in some power outages. In Augusta, heavy precipitation forced 300 people to evacuate, while police officers rescued people in flooded cars. About 450 were left homeless. A tornado was spawned in Brantley County, which destroyed 25 unoccupied homes. Overall, there were five deaths and about $42 million in damage.
June 29–July 3, 1991 – The precursor of Tropical Storm Ana drops light rainfall in southeastern Georgia.
August 27–28, 1992 – Dissipating Hurricane Andrew produced tropical storm force winds in Atlanta. Several damaging tornadoes were spawned in the state, causing about $100,000 in losses. Additionally, precipitation peaked at  near Mountain City.
August 28, 1992 – Although located well offshore, the outerbands of Tropical Storm Earl produce light rainfall in Georgia.
Tropical Storm Alberto (1994) In Georgia, rainfall from the tropical cyclone peaked at 27.85 in (707 mm) near Americus. Due to a previously stalled cold front, which subsequently caused Alberto to remain stationary, the ground was already saturated with rainfall. Virtually all of the precipitation became instant runoff into streams and rivers. Peak discharges along the Flint and Ocmulgee rivers exceeded 100-year flood levels. At least 100 dam and recreational watersheds suffered severe damage or were destroyed. Many roads were inundated, forcing the closure of 175 roads and 1,000 bridges. Damage to highway infrastructure exceeded $130 million. Approximately 471,000 acres (191,000 ha) of croplands were submerged, causing about $100 million in damage to agriculture. Fifteen of the United States Geological Survey's (USGS) gaging stations were severely damaged or demolished, forcing data to be collected manually and reported by cellphone. Due to flooded water system, approximately 500,000 people were temporarily left without drinking water. There were 31 deaths in the state, most of which from cars being swept onto flooded roads or into swollen creeks. With $750 million in damage, Alberto was considered the costliest tropical cyclone in Georgia, while the flooding was considered the worst in the history of the state.
Tropical Depression Two (1994)
Tropical Storm Beryl (1994)
Tropical Depression Ten (1994)
Hurricane Gordon (1994)
Hurricane Allison (1995)
Hurricane Erin (1995)
Tropical Storm Jerry (1995)
Hurricane Opal
Tropical Storm Josephine (1996)
Hurricane Danny (1997)
Hurricane Earl (1998)
Hurricane Georges
Tropical Storm Hermine (1998)
Hurricane Dennis (1999)
Hurricane Floyd
October 15–17, 1999 – In association with Hurricane Irene, tropical cyclone warnings and watches were posted in Georgia, with a tropical storm watch for the entire coast and later a hurricane warning from Savannah northward. However, the storm brings only very light precipitation to the state, peaking at  near Savannah.

2000–2009

September 18–19, 2000 – Hurricane Gordon crossed the state as it was weakening and transitioning into an extratropical cyclone.
June 11–13, 2001 – Tropical Storm Allison brought heavy rain and flooding to many counties in central and east central Georgia. Precipitation in the state peaked at  near Quitman. Several counties were impacted by flooding, with many roads and bridges being washed out. In Greene County, a bridge was washed out, leaving 25 residents of a neighborhood stranded. Over 20 roads were inundated in the county; Baldwin, Brooks, Lowndes, Pulaski, Putnam, and Taliaferro counties also reported that numerous secondary roads and some state highways were flooded. In Pulaski County, a road in the southwest part of the county was washed out, leaving a  canyon. In Milledgeville, an Animal Hospital had to be evacuated when a nearby creek rising out of its banks threatened to flood the facility.
September 11–13, 2001 – The outer bands of Hurricane Gabrielle produced  of precipitation in Brunswick.
July 9–13, 2002 – The precursor to Tropical Storm Arthur dropped light rainfall in the state, with up to  near Dallas.
August 4, 2002 – The outer bands of Tropical Storm Bertha dropped minimal amounts of precipitation in southeastern Georgia.
The heavy rainfall helped to relieve a persistent drought. However, climatologists determined that the rainfall did not fully alleviate the dry conditions. In the Atlanta area, 48,000 customers experienced power outages. The winds tore a roof off a house and damaged a number of mobile homes. The heavy rainfall caused severe flooding; in Donalsonville, 250 houses and 50 businesses suffered water damage, while another 35 were damaged in nearby Miller County. Roads were flooded, including parts of U.S. Route 27. Crop damage was significant in the state; about $19 million in damage to cotton and peanut crops were reported.
With saturated soils across the region from recent heavy rainfall, several weak and small trees were blown down. Some of the trees fell down on power lines. The hardest hit areas included Blairsville, Blue Ridge, Cedartown, and Ellijay. Catoosa, Floyd, Gilmer, Gordon, Murray, Union, and Whitfield counties all reported that a number of trees and power lines were down. In Union County, nearly two dozen trees were blown down, one of which caused damage to a house. Rainfall from the storm peaked at  near Mountain City, causing local flooding in some areas. In Lawrenceville, two offices of the Gwinnett Daily Post flooded. Mud and other debris was also reported in the two buildings.
October 9–11, 2002 – Hurricane Kyle dropped moderate rainfall that peaked at 5.35 inches (136 mm) at Hunter Army Airfield. Most of the precipitation fell in a 12-hour period, which flooded roads and low-lying areas; several roads were closed, and numerous vehicles stalled in the floodwaters.

Tropical Storm Bill (2003) – The storm produced moderate rainfall in northwestern Georgia, which peaked at 7.1 inches (180 mm) in Monroe. Precipitation caused flooding in numerous locations around the Atlanta metropolitan area, leaving some roads impassable or closed. An F1 tornado touched down near Pennington and caused severe damage to two dairy sheds, a tractor, and three metal storage buildings. The tornado then destroyed a hay barn, a carport, and a car inside the carport as well, while also causing a tree to fall. It continued through a forested area, toppling hundreds of trees. As it entered a more urban area, it downed 30 isolated trees, some of which fell on a portion of Interstate 20, temporarily closing the roadway. The tornado damaged seven houses, primarily to roof damage, although one experienced damage to several windows, while another had a utility trailer and a car damaged by fallen trees; a commercial building was damaged as well. An F2 tornado in Clito knocked down trees and damaged mobile homes. Severe thunderstorms caused considerable damage to a house near Louisville and knocked down several trees. Bill also caused thunderstorms in Kite which uprooted several trees onto a car and a house. One man in Atlanta died due to a falling tree. Damage totaled to $244,500.
Tropical Depression Seven (2003) – Made landfall near St. Catherines Island.
Tropical Storm Bonnie (2004) – This storm dropped generally light rainfall in Georgia.
Hurricane Charley – The outerbands of Hurricane Charley bring light precipitation to most of coastal and central Georgia.
Significant crop damage occurred, particularly to the cotton and the peanut crops. On average, 30 percent of the crops were lost during Frances.
Hurricane Ivan
Hurricane Jeanne
Tropical Storm Matthew (2004) – The remnants of Tropical Storm Matthew brought light rainfall to northern Georgia.
Tropical Storm Arlene (2005) – Tropical Storm Arlene brought rainfall to much of the state, causing localized flooding. In Towns County, multiple residents were forced evacuate due to overflowing creeks and rivers in the northern portion of Georgia.

 Hurricane Cindy spawned a tornado in Hampton, causing damage to Atlanta Motor Speedway and Tara Field. A tornado in Fayette County damaged three homes and caused about $3 million in losses. Four other tornadoes were confirmed across the state. Hartsfield–Jackson Atlanta International Airport in Atlanta recorded over 5 inches (130 mm) of rain on July 6, its sixth-highest one-day rainfall since records began in 1878. This is more rain than the area normally gets in all of July.
Hurricane Dennis – The outerbands of Hurricane Dennis caused local flooding the Atlanta area. One fatality occurred when a man was struck by a falling tree.
Hurricane Katrina – Hurricane Katrina brought heavy rains and strong winds to northern and central Georgia. At least 18 tornadoes formed in Georgia on August 29, the most on record in that state for one day in August. The most serious of these tornadoes was an F2 tornado which affected Heard County and Carroll County. This tornado caused 3 injuries and one fatality and damaged several houses. In addition this tornado destroyed several poultry barns, killing over 140,000 chicks. The other tornadoes caused significant damages to buildings and agricultural facilities. In addition to the fatality caused by the F2 tornado, there was another fatality in a traffic accident.
Hurricane Ophelia (2005) – Hurricane Ophelia brought light rainfall and storm surge to coastal Georgia.
Several dirt and coastal roads were washed out. In Brunswick, 30 homes were damaged by flooding. A tornado in the area snapped trees and caused moderate roof damage. 
Hurricane Wilma – The outerbands of Hurricane Wilma brought light rainfall to southern and coastal Georgia.
Tropical Storm Alberto (2006) – As Tropical Storm Alberto moved through Georgia, moderate winds of up to  occurred along the coastline. Rainfall ranged from 3–5 inches (75–125 mm) across the southeast portion of the state, with a peak of 7.05 inches (179 mm) in Rincon. Alberto produced a storm tide of 8.53 feet (2.6 m) at Fort Pulaski National Monument, causing some beach erosion.
Hurricane Ernesto (2006) – The outerbands of Hurricane Ernesto produced light rains and gusty winds in coastal Georgia.
Tropical Storm Barry (2007)
Hurricane Humberto (2007)
Tropical Depression Ten (2007)
Tropical Storm Cristobal (2008)
Tropical Storm Fay (2008)
Hurricane Ike
Tropical Storm Claudette (2009)
Hurricane Ida (2009)

2010–2019
Tropical Depression Five (2010)
Hurricane Earl (2010)
Hurricane Irene
Tropical Storm Lee (2011)
May 22, 2012 – Light winds associated with Tropical Storm Alberto were observed at the Malcolm McKinnon Airport on St. Simons Island.
May 26-29, 2012 – Hours before Tropical Storm Beryl moved ashore on May 27, officials in Cumberland Island, Georgia mandated that all campers evacuate the island. Storm surge flooded portions of St. Marys. Beryl's rainfall was beneficial in alleviating drought conditions, despite causing some minor flooding. Downed trees damaged two homes in McIntosh County,
Localized and isolated flooding occurred in nearby Lowndes County.
August 28–30, 2012 – The outer bands of Hurricane Isaac dropped light rainfall, peaking at  near Guyton. 
October 27–28, 2012 – Hurricane Sandy passed well offshore, though a few locations observed tropical storm force winds, especially near the Georgia-South Carolina state line. In Fort Pulaski, gusts reached .
Tropical Storm Andrea (2013)
Hurricane Arthur (2014)
Tropical Storm Ana (2015)
Tropical Storm Bonnie (2016)
Tropical Storm Colin (2016)
Hurricane Hermine (2016)
Tropical Storm Julia (2016)
Hurricane Matthew (2016)
Tropical Storm Cindy (2017)
Hurricane Harvey (2017)
Hurricane Irma (2017)
Hurricane Nate (2017)
Tropical Storm Alberto (2018)
Hurricane Florence (2018)
Tropical Storm Gordon (2018)
Hurricane Michael (2018)
Hurricane Barry (2019)
Hurricane Dorian (2019)
Tropical Storm Nestor (2019)
Tropical Storm Olga (2019)

2020–Present
Tropical Storm Fay (2020)
Hurricane Marco (2020)
Hurricane Sally (2020)
Tropical Storm Beta (2020)
Hurricane Delta (2020)
Hurricane Zeta (2020)
Hurricane Eta (2020)
Tropical Storm Claudette (2021)
Tropical Storm Danny (2021)
Hurricane Elsa (2021)
Tropical Storm Fred (2021)
Tropical Storm Mindy (2021)
Tropical Storm Alex (2022) brought light rainfall to the state.

Effects

Notes

References

Atlantic hurricanes
Lists of tropical cyclones in the United States